Happisburgh Cliffs is a  geological Site of Special Scientific Interest west of North Walsham in Norfolk. It is a Geological Conservation Review site.

These cliffs are unique as they display three glacial deposits, from the 1.9 million year old Pre-Pastonian Stage to the Beestonian and the Cromer Tills of the Anglian stage 450,000 years ago, the most severe ice age of the Pleistocene.

The cliffs are above a public beach.

References

Sites of Special Scientific Interest in Norfolk
Geological Conservation Review sites